Diego Elías (born November 19, 1996 in Lima) is a squash player who represents Peru. He reached a career-high world ranking of No. 2 in February 2023.

His accomplishments include winning World Junior Championships twice, British Junior Open Twice, and winning the US Junior Open in Boys' U15, U17, and U19. On July 27, 2019 he won a gold medal at the 2019 Pan American Games in Lima, Peru. In October 2021, Elías won the Qatar QTerminals Classic, his first PSA World Tour Platinum title. Most recently, Elias emerged victorious at the Necker Mauritius Open, a PSA Gold tournament, in June 2022.

See also 
 Official Men's Squash World Ranking

References

External links 
 Diego Elias: Son of Two Cities
 Jonathon Power on coaching Diego Elias
 
 
 

1996 births
Living people
Peruvian squash players
Sportspeople from Lima
Pan American Games medalists in squash
Pan American Games silver medalists for Peru
Pan American Games bronze medalists for Peru
Squash players at the 2015 Pan American Games
Squash players at the 2019 Pan American Games
South American Games gold medalists for Peru
South American Games medalists in squash
Competitors at the 2018 South American Games
Competitors at the 2013 World Games
Competitors at the 2017 World Games
Medalists at the 2015 Pan American Games
Medalists at the 2019 Pan American Games
Pan American Games gold medalists for Peru